Wavoo Wajeeha Women's College of Arts & Science, is a women's premium self-finance degree college located in Kayalpatnam, Thoothukudi district, Tamil Nadu. It was established in 2006. The college is affiliated with Manonmaniam Sundaranar University. This college offers different courses in Arts, Commerce and Science in both Under Graduate and Post Graduate. The college was established by the Wavoo SAR Educational Trust.

The primary objective of the institution is to provide higher education to the girls in the rural area without any discrimination of caste, creed and religion, bringing out their inherent abilities to make them highly qualified, morally sound, socially disciplined and technically competent individuals.

The college was started with 124 students and 12 staff members in the academic year 2006-2007, has grown steadily. At present it has 1,500 students enrolled in various disciplines of Arts and Sciences, both in undergraduate and post-graduate levels, with more than 75 teaching faculty, and more than 45 members of non-teaching and supporting staff.

Departments

Bachelor of Science
Physics
Mathematics
Information Technology
Computer Science

Bachelor of Arts and Commerce
Tamil
English
Economics
Commerce
Business administration

The Internal Quality Assurance Cell of the college promotes quality in teaching – learning as well as infrastructure through continuous monitoring and constant follow-up of undergoing activities. The cell has been functioning to endeavor to provide a good atmosphere in acquiring knowledge. It envisages giving quality assurance in all ventures undertaken by the management both in academic and administrative activities.

“Quality Policy” being is the vision of the cell, It undertakes the mission in encouraging self-evaluation, accountability and undertakes quality-related research studies, training in skill based courses and introducing socially relevant extension programmes. It consistently works for catalytic improvement and consciously contributes towards the academic excellence of the institution. By implementing feedback system, it collaborate with other stakeholders to achieve sustainability in the higher education.

The team members of the cell acquaint themselves towards collecting and collating documents with the aegis of all the faculty and non faculty members of the college for periodic assessments and presentations and plan to accredit the institution with the National Assessment and Accreditation and National Institutional Ranking Framework.

Accreditation
The college is  recognized by the University Grants Commission.

References

External links
http://www.wavoowajeehacollege.com
http://wavoowajeehacollege.in/emblem.php

Educational institutions established in 2006
2006 establishments in Tamil Nadu
Colleges affiliated to Manonmaniam Sundaranar University
Universities and colleges in Thoothukudi district